Haho may refer to:

 Haho Prefecture, a region of Togo
 Haho River, a tributary of Lake Togo
 Haho, Burkina Faso, a village in Burkina Faso
 Haho of Maui, ancient Hawaiian chief
 Haho Monastery, a Georgian monastery in Turkey
 HAHO (high altitude, high opening), a technique in parachuting